The Junction is a small, inner city suburb of Newcastle, New South Wales, Australia, located  southwest of Newcastle's central business district. It was originally part of Merewether, which is reflected in the names of some of the suburb's establishments, but was gazetted as a suburb on 17 May 1991.

At the 2016 census The Junction had a population of around 1,000.

Education
The Junction has two schools, both of which cater to Primary students.

The Junction Public School was established in 1872 on land donated by Mr Edward Charles Merewether. It suffered significant damage during the 1989 Newcastle earthquake and much of the school had to be demolished.

St Joseph's Primary School in Farquhar St is a Catholic school that was established in 1885.

Recreational Activities 
Arnold's Swim Centre is located on 46 Kemp Street  which offers babies classes to advanced courses.

Notes

  Area obtained from Land and Property Management Authority imagery and 1:100000 map Newcastle 9232.

References

Suburbs of Newcastle, New South Wales